Turkey participates in the 2022 Mediterranean Games held in Oran, Algeria from 25 June to  5 July 2022. 321 athletes from Turkey were registered to compete in 24 sports at the Games.

Medalists

| width="78%" align="left" valign="top" |

| width="22%" align="left" valign="top" |

Archery

Athletics

Men
Track & road events

Field events

Women
Track & road events

Field events

Badminton 

Turkey competed in badminton.

Basketball

Men's 3x3 tournament
Group A

Quarterfinal

Semifinals

Bronze medal game

Women's 3x3 tournament
Group C

Quarterfinal

Semifinal

Bronze medal game

Boules 

Turkey competed in boules.

Men

Women

Boxing 

Turkey competed in boxing.

Men

Women

Cycling

Men

Women

Equestrian

Fencing 

Turkey competed in fencing.

Men

Women

Football 

Summary

Team roster

Group play

Semifinal

Bronze medal match

Gymnastics 

Turkey competed in artistic gymnastics.

Men's artistic individual all-around

Men

Women artistic individual all-around

Women

Handball

Summary

Men's tournament
Team roster

Group play

Seventh place game

Women's tournament
Team roster

Group play

Fifth place game

Judo 

Turkey competed in judo.

Men

Women

Karate

Sailing 

Turkey competed in sailing.

Shooting 

Turkey competed in shooting.

Men

Women

Mixed events

Swimming 

Men

Women

Volleyball 

Turkey competed in volleyball.

Summary

Men's tournament

|}

|}

Quarterfinal

|}

Classification 5th–8th

|}

Fifth place game

|}

Women's tournament

Preliminary round

|}

|}

Quarterfinal

|}

Semifinal

|}

Final

|}

Table tennis 

Turkey competed in table tennis.

Taekwondo 

Men

Women

Tennis 

Turkey competed in tennis.

Men

Women

Water polo

Summary

Group play

Seventh place game

Weightlifting 

Men

Women

Wrestling

Men's Freestyle

Greco-Roman

Women's Freestyle

References

Nations at the 2022 Mediterranean Games
2022
Mediterranean Games